The inter-confederation play-offs of the 2023 FIFA Women's World Cup qualification determined the final three qualification spots for the 2023 FIFA Women's World Cup. The play-off tournament was used as a test event for New Zealand to host prior to the Women's World Cup. It took place from 18 to 23 February 2023, and featured ten teams split into three groups, with the winner of each group qualifying for the Women's World Cup. New Zealand and guests Argentina also played friendlies against participating teams and each other as part of the event.

Format
On 24 December 2020, the Bureau of the FIFA Council approved the slot allocation and format of the play-off tournament.
AFC (Asia): 2 slots
CAF (Africa): 2 slots
CONCACAF (North, Central America and the Caribbean): 2 slots
CONMEBOL (South America): 2 slots
OFC (Oceania): 1 slot
UEFA (Europe): 1 slot

The play-off tournament was held in New Zealand as a test event prior to their hosting of 2023 FIFA Women's World Cup. It featured ten teams, split into three groups of three (Group A and B) or four (Group C). The winner of each group qualified for the FIFA Women's World Cup. Four teams were seeded into groups based on the FIFA Women's World Rankings. In Groups A and B, two unseeded teams faced each other in a semi-final. The winner of the semi-final advanced to the play-off final, playing against the seeded team for a spot in the Women's World Cup. In Group C, the two seeded teams faced an unseeded team in the semi-finals. The winners of the semi-finals faced each other in the play-off final for a spot in the Women's World Cup.

New Zealand and Argentina (confirmed as guests on 8 December 2022) participated in friendly matches as part of the event, first against one of the seeded teams in Groups A and B, and then twice against each other. Friendly matches also took place between the semi-final loser of Groups A and B, as well as the two semi-final losers of Group C, thereby ensuring that all play-off teams played two matches at the event.

New Zealand were confirmed as the sole host nation for the play-off tournament on 4 July 2022. Australia were originally planned as co-hosts of the play-offs, with their national team intended to participate in friendly matches.

Qualified teams
The following teams from each confederation qualified for the play-off tournament.

Venues
The two venues for the tournament were confirmed by FIFA on 4 July 2022.

Draw
The play-off draw took place on 14 October 2022, 12:00 CEST (UTC+2), in Zürich, Switzerland. Four teams were seeded into groups based on the FIFA Women's World Rankings of 13 October 2022 (shown in parentheses), with a maximum of one seeded team per confederation. The UEFA team was automatically seeded into pot 1, so as to prevent three European teams from being drawn into the same group in the final tournament. The highest-ranked team was placed in slot A1, the second-highest in slot B1, the third-highest in slot C1 and the fourth-highest in slot C2. The remaining six teams were unseeded and drawn into the remaining slots, with the condition that teams from the same confederation could not be drawn into the same group. In the draw, the six unseeded teams were allocated to the first available group sequentially (from A to C, before repeating). After a team was selected, a separate draw then determined the team's position within their respective group for the purposes of the schedule.

Squads

Each team had to provide to FIFA a preliminary squad of between 35 and 55 players, which was not to be published. From the preliminary squad, each team had to name a final squad of up to 23 players (three of whom must be goalkeepers). Players in the final squad could be replaced due to serious injury or illness up to 24 hours prior to the team's first match.

Schedule
The match schedule and venues, without kick-off times, were confirmed on 4 July 2022. The kick-off times were confirmed on 5 November 2022, after the play-off draw. The semi-finals took place from 18 to 19 February, while the finals took place from 22 to 23 February 2023.

All times listed are local, NZDT (UTC+13).

Group A
The winner of Group A entered Group E in the final tournament.

Bracket

Semi-final

Final

Group B
The winner of Group B entered Group D in the final tournament.

Bracket

Semi-final

Final

Group C
The winner of Group C entered Group F in the final tournament.

Bracket

Semi-finals

Final

Goalscorers

Qualified teams for FIFA Women's World Cup
The following three teams qualified for the 2023 FIFA Women's World Cup.

Associated friendly matches
Friendly matches were scheduled during the play-off tournament in New Zealand. They had no bearing on qualification, but were considered by FIFA to be part of the event.

Discipline
A player was automatically suspended for the next match for receiving a red card, which could be extended for serious offences.

The following suspensions were served during the tournament:

Player of the Match award
A player of the match was named for each game at the tournament, including friendlies.

Notes

References

External links

Play-off
Fifa Women's World Cup qualification
International women's association football competitions hosted by New Zealand
2022–23 in New Zealand association football
2022–23 in OFC football
Events in Hamilton, New Zealand
Sport in Hamilton, New Zealand
2020s in Auckland
Sports competitions in Auckland